The South Carolina General Assembly, also called the South Carolina Legislature, is the state legislature of the U.S. state of South Carolina. The legislature is bicameral and consists of the lower South Carolina House of Representatives and the upper South Carolina Senate. All together, the General Assembly consists of 170 members. The legislature convenes at the State House in Columbia.

Prior to the 1964 federal Reynolds v. Sims decision by the U.S. Supreme Court, each county doubled as a legislative district, with each county electing one senator and at least one representative.  Moreover, each county's General Assembly delegation also doubled as its county council, as the state constitution made no provision for local government.

The "one man, one vote" provision of Reynolds v. Sims caused district lines to cross county lines, causing legislators to be on multiple county councils.  This led to the passage of the Home Rule Act of 1975, which created county councils that were independent of the General Assembly.  However, the General Assembly still retains considerable authority over local government. As a result, the legislature still devotes considerable time to local matters, and county legislative delegations still handle many matters that are handled by county governments in the rest of the country.

There are 146 members of the South Carolina House of Representatives, who are elected every two years, and the South Carolina Senate has 46 members, elected every four years concurrent to the presidential election.  For both houses, there are no term limits.  The General Assembly meets in joint session to elect judges, with all 170 members having an equal vote in such elections.

Role 
The main role of the South Carolina General Assembly is to pass laws "as the common good may require." In order for a bill to become law, both the Senate and House of Representatives must vote to pass the bill by a simple majority. Then the bill must be sent to the governor. If the governor vetoes the bill, both houses can either sustain the veto or override the veto. Veto overrides require a two-thirds majority. Once he receives the bill, if the governor neither signs nor vetoes the bill, it becomes law after five days, Sundays excluded.

Qualifications

Senators

According to the South Carolina Constitution, no person may serve as a senator who:

Is not qualified to vote in state elections
Is not a resident of the district in which he or she seeks to represent 
Is not at least 25 years of age
Has been convicted of or pleaded guilty to a felony or voter fraud or bribery unless 15 years has elapsed since the time was served.

Representatives

According to the South Carolina Constitution, no person may serve as a representative who:

Is not qualified to vote in state elections
Is not a resident of the district in which he or she seeks to represent 
Is not at least 21 years of age
Has been convicted of or pleaded guilty to a felony or voter fraud or bribery unless 15 years has elapsed since the time was served.

Officers

Senate

House of Representatives

Historic Party Control

See also
South Carolina State House
South Carolina House of Representatives
South Carolina Senate
South Carolina government and politics 
Governor of South Carolina
Lieutenant Governor of South Carolina
South Carolina Code of Laws

Notes

References

External links
South Carolina Legislature Online

 
Government of South Carolina
Bicameral legislatures